St. Luke's Church is a historic church on US 9 in Clermont, Columbia County, New York.  It was built in 1857 and is a one-story, Gothic Revival style frame church with a steeply pitched gable roof and board and batten siding.  It features a large open framed bell tower with a polygonal steeple and elaborate trim.  The entry porch gable roof has a decorative bargeboard.  It was designed by noted ecclesiastical architect Richard M. Upjohn (1828-1903).  The church was decommissioned and was donated for town use in the 1970s.

It was listed on the National Register of Historic Places in 1983.  It is located within the Clermont Civic Historic District, established in 2003.

References

Churches on the National Register of Historic Places in New York (state)
Carpenter Gothic church buildings in New York (state)
Churches completed in 1857
19th-century churches in the United States
Churches in Columbia County, New York
Richard Michell Upjohn church buildings
Historic district contributing properties in New York (state)
National Register of Historic Places in Columbia County, New York
1857 establishments in New York (state)